South West Norfolk is a constituency represented in the House of Commons of the UK Parliament since 2010 by Liz Truss of the Conservative Party, who briefly served as Prime Minister of the United Kingdom from September to October 2022.

Constituency profile 
This is a rural constituency which retains a significant agricultural and food-production sector. The population is largely White and predominantly homeowners, with incomes and house prices slightly below the UK average. Electoral Calculus describes this as a "Strong Right" seat characterised by socially conservative values and strong support for Brexit.

History 
Under the Redistribution of Seats Act 1885, the three two-member county divisions of Norfolk were replaced with six single-member divisions, including the newly created South-Western Division of Norfolk, largely formed from southern parts of the abolished Western Division, including Thetford. From the 1950 general election onwards, it has been formally known as the county constituency of South West Norfolk.

South West Norfolk has been held solidly by Conservatives since 1964, but for twenty years prior; it had been ultra-marginal. Labour first held it briefly from 1929-31, and Sidney Dye of the Labour Party gained it in 1945 with a narrow majority of 53 votes. Dye subsequently retained the seat at the 1950 general election with an increased, but nevertheless, small majority of 260 votes. He lost it to Denys Bullard of the Conservatives in 1951 by 442 votes and regained the seat from Bullard in 1955 with a small majority of 193 votes. Dye died at the end of 1958, and at the by-election, the Labour Party candidate Albert Hilton retained the seat with an increased majority of 1,354 votes. At the 1959 general election that soon followed, Hilton's safe majority was drastically reduced to a thin margin of 78 votes.

Although Labour had held the seat at two general elections, despite two consecutive overall Conservative victories; the Conservatives won the seat at the 1964 general election, which was a Labour victory nationwide, and the party returned to government after 13 years in opposition. Paul Hawkins, then Gillian Shephard held the seat. Shephard's majority was slashed at the 1997 general election, in what would be the worst defeat nationwide for the Conservative Party in 91 years, before recovering at the 2001 general election. Both occasions resulted in an overall Labour victory.

Shephard decided not to run again in 2005 and was elevated to a peerage. The Conservative Party selected Christopher Fraser, former MP for Mid Dorset and Poole North and he was elected with a comfortable majority of over 10,000 votes.

On 28 May 2009, Fraser announced that he would be standing down at the 2010 general election citing family reasons. This was after his expenses claims were highlighted in The Daily Telegraph; according to the newspaper, Fraser claimed £1,800 in public money for buying 215 trees and marking out the boundary of his second home in the constituency.

Liz Truss was elected to succeed Fraser at the 2010 general election, which saw the Conservatives return to government after 13 years in opposition, however, the party went into a coalition with the Liberal Democrats. Truss served as a Cabinet Minister under various Conservative Prime Ministers since 2014, serving as Environment Secretary between 2014-16 under the leadership of David Cameron, Secretary of State for Justice and Lord Chancellor between 2016-17 under the leadership of Theresa May, and Secretary of State for International Trade and President of the Board of Trade between 2019-21 under the leadership of Boris Johnson; before she was promoted to serve as Secretary of State for Foreign, Commonwealth and Development Affairs in 2021. In 2022, Truss won the July–September 2022 Conservative Party leadership election that followed Boris Johnson's decision to stand down as UK Prime Minister and Leader of the Conservative Party, and was subsequently appointed Prime Minister by Queen Elizabeth II on 6 September. Truss resigned as Prime Minister of the United Kingdom on 25 October 2022.

Boundaries and boundary changes

1885–1918: The part of the Municipal Borough of Thetford in the county of Norfolk, and the Sessional Divisions of Clackclose, Grimshoe, South Greenhoe, and Wayland.

1918–1950: The Municipal Borough of Thetford, the Urban Districts of Downham Market, East Dereham, and Swaffham, the Rural Districts of Mitford and Launditch, and Swaffham, and parts of the Rural Districts of Downham, Marshland, and Thetford.

Gained northern areas of the abolished Mid Division of Norfolk, including East Dereham, and a small area in the south of the Northern Division. Transferred a small area in the east to the Southern Division.

1950–1983: The Urban Districts of Downham Market, East Dereham, and Swaffham, and the Rural Districts of Downham, Mitford and Launditch, and Swaffham.

Thetford transferred to South Norfolk.  Minor changes to boundary with King's Lynn to align with boundaries of local authorities.

1983–2010: The District of Breckland wards of All Saints, Besthorpe, Buckenham, Conifer, East Guiltcross, Haggard De Toni, Harling, Haverscroft, Heathlands, Mid Forest, Nar Valley, Necton, Peddars Way, Queen's, Swaffham, Templar, Thetford Abbey, Thetford Barnham Cross, Thetford Guildhall, Thetford Saxon, Watton, Wayland, Weeting, West Guiltcross, and Wissey, and the Borough of King's Lynn and West Norfolk wards of Airfield, Denton, Denver, Downham Market, Emneth, Ten Mile, Upwell Outwell and Delph, Watlington, and Wissey.

Thetford transferred back from South Norfolk, together with areas comprising the former Rural District of Wayland, including Attleborough. North-eastern areas, including East Dereham, transferred to the re-established County Constituency of Mid Norfolk.  Minor re-alignment of boundary with North West Norfolk.

2010–present: The District of Breckland wards of Conifer, East Guiltcross, Harling and Heathlands, Mid Forest, Nar Valley, Swaffham, Thetford Abbey, Thetford Castle, Thetford Guildhall, Thetford Saxon, Wayland, Weeting, and West Guiltcross, and the Borough of King's Lynn and West Norfolk wards of Airfield, Denton, Downham Old Town, East Downham, Emneth with Outwell, Hilgay with Denver, Mershe Lande, North Downham, St Lawrence, South Downham, Upwell and Delph, Walton, Watlington, Wiggenhall, and Wimbotsham with Fincham Wissey.

As a result of the Boundary Commission's report which came into effect for the 2010 general election, South West Norfolk gained wards from neighbouring North West Norfolk including Walpole, Tilney St Lawrence, and Wiggenhall villages. It lost to Mid Norfolk the wards of All Saints, Buckenham, Burgh and Haverscroft, Haggard De Toni, Necton, Queen's, Templar and Watton, which included the villages of Necton, Great Ellingham and Watton.

The constituency includes Downham Market, Swaffham, Thetford, Outwell, Upwell, and Feltwell.

Members of Parliament

Elections

Elections in the 2010s
:

:

:

:

Having been reformed for the 2010 election, the changes in percentage figures are based on results if the current constituency had been fought in the 2005 election.

Elections in the 2000s

Elections in the 1990s

Elections in the 1980s

Elections in the 1970s

Elections in the 1960s

Elections in the 1950s

Election in the 1940s

Elections in the 1930s

Elections in the 1920s

Elections in the 1910s

Elections in the 1900s

Elections in the 1890s

Elections in the 1880s

See also 
 List of parliamentary constituencies in Norfolk

Notes

References

Parliamentary constituencies in Norfolk
Constituencies of the Parliament of the United Kingdom established in 1885
Liz Truss
Constituencies of the Parliament of the United Kingdom represented by a sitting Prime Minister